Waijiaobu is the Chinese name for a Ministry of Foreign Affairs. When untranslated in English text, it especially refers to:

 Ministry of Foreign Affairs (Republic of China), of all China from 1927 to 1949 then just Taiwan since 1949
 Ministry of Foreign Affairs of the People's Republic of China, of all China since 1949